In demonology, Furfur (other spelling: Furtur, Ferthur) is a powerful Great Earl of Hell, being the ruler of twenty-six legions of demons. He is a liar unless compelled to enter a magic triangle where he gives true answers to every question, speaking with a rough voice. Furfur causes love between a man and a woman, creates storms, tempests, thunder, lightning, and teaches on secret and divine things.

He is depicted as a deer or winged deer, and also as an angel. To some authors he changes from deer into angel when compelled to enter the magic triangle.

Furfur in Latin 
'Furfur' or 'furfures' in Latin means "bran". However it seems more likely that the name is a corruption of 'furcifer', the Latin word for scoundrel.

See also

The Lesser Key of Solomon
Peryton

References

Sources
 S. L. MacGregor Mathers, A. Crowley, The Goetia: The Lesser Key of Solomon the King (1904). 1995 reprint: . Page 45

Goetic demons
Mythological deer